The 2019 Volta a Portugal was the 81st edition of the Volta a Portugal cycle race and was held on 31 July to 12 August 2019. The race started in Viseu and finished in Porto.

Teams 
The 18 teams participating in the race are:

Stages

Classification leadership 
There arefour main individual classifications being contested in the 2019 Volta a Portugal, as well a team, combination and national rider competition. The most important is the general classification, which is calculated by adding each rider's finishing times on each stage. The rider with the lowest cumulative time is the winner of the general classification and was considered to be the overall winner of the Tour. The rider leading the classification wore a yellow jersey sponsored by Santander.

Second, there is a points classification, which awards a green jersey sponsored by Rubis Gás. In the points classification, cyclists receive points for finishing inside the top 10 in a stage apart from the prologue. Depending on the type of finish, different points are distributed among the top 10. In addition, riders receive points for finishing in the top three at intermediate sprints during each stage – awarded on a 5–3–1 scale.

There is also a mountains classification, the leadership of which is marked by a blue jersey sponsored by Liberty Seguros. In the mountains classification, points towards the classification are won by reaching the top of a climb before other cyclists. Each climb is categorised as either category S, 1st, 2nd, 3rd or 4th, with more points available for the higher-categorised climbs.

The fourth jersey represents the young rider classification, marked by a white jersey sponsored by Jogos Santa Casa. This is decided the same way as the general classification, but only riders born on or after 1 January 1996 are eligible to be ranked in the classification.

There were also awards for the team classification, in which the times of the best three cyclists per team on each stage are added together; the leading team at the end of the race is the team with the lowest total time. The number of stage victories and placings per team determined the outcome of a tie. The riders in the team that led this classification were identified with yellow number bibs on the back of their jerseys.

The next individual award was the combination (Kombinado) classification. A rider's ranking in the combination classification was determined by tallying up his positions in the general, points and mountains classifications. If no rider was classified in all three classifications, riders classified in two would have been considered, and if that was tied the general classification will decide the winner. This classification was sponsored by Kia.

The seven and final award represents the classification for Portuguese riders and was sponsored by Jogos Santa Casa. This is decided the same way as the general classification, but only riders born in Portugal are eligible to be ranked in the classification. Like the combination award this is only presented on the podium and is not worn in race.

A total of €128,790 was awarded in cash prizes in the race. The overall winner of the general classification received €16,045, with the second and third placed riders getting €8,115 and €3,985 respectively. All finishers in the top 20 were awarded with money. The final winners of the points, mountains, young rider, combination and best Portuguese rider classifications were given €1,500. The team classification winners were awarded a trophy. €3,060 was given to the winners of each stage of the race, apart from the prologue where the winner was given €1,490, with smaller amounts given to places 2–20.

References

External links 
 

2019
Volta a Portugal
Volta a Portugal
Volta a Portugal
Volta a Portugal